Lawrence Hill is an electoral ward of Bristol, United Kingdom and includes the districts of Barton Hill, St Philips Marsh and Redcliffe, Temple Meads and parts of Easton and the Broadmead shopping area. Lawrence Hill takes its name from a leper hospital dedicated to St Lawrence, which was founded by King John.

It is one of the most deprived electoral wards in the south west region of England, was part of the Bristol European Union Objective 2 area, and had a New Deal for Communities project within its boundaries. In 2013 the City Academy Bristol secondary school opened in the area. The Bristol and Bath Railway Path starts in the south of the ward.

Lawrence Hill can pointed out on Bristol skyline by its large 1960s tower blocks situated in the area.

Transport

It is served by Lawrence Hill railway station and Stapleton Road railway station in the north-east of the ward, Bristol Temple Meads railway station in the south-west, and buses to Bath, Bitton, Keynsham, Kingswood, Longwell Green and Staple Hill.

References

External links

 Map of Lawrence Hill circa 1900

Areas of Bristol
Wards of Bristol